Georgia's Own Credit Union is a credit union based in Atlanta, Georgia that was founded in 1940.

Georgia's Own Credit Union is the 3rd largest credit union in Georgia with over 188,000 members and assets of 2.38 billion as of March 2018.  They operate 23 branch locations in Georgia. In addition, Georgia's Own Credit Union belongs to the CO-OP Network which provides its members access to over 30,000 surcharge-free ATMs and 5,000 Shared Branch locations. The organization is a federally insured credit union that is regulated by the National Credit Union Administration (NCUA).

In 2016, Georgia's Own Credit Union moved into what was commonly referred to as the Equitable Building in Downtown Atlanta.

References

Companies based in Atlanta
1940 establishments in Georgia (U.S. state)
Credit unions based in Georgia (U.S. state)
American companies established in 1940